Auto-Tune (or autotune) is an audio processor introduced in 1996 by American company Antares Audio Technologies. Auto-Tune uses a proprietary device to measure and alter pitch in vocal and instrumental music recording and performances.

Auto-Tune was originally intended to disguise or correct off-key inaccuracies, allowing vocal tracks to be perfectly tuned despite originally being slightly off-pitch. The 1998 Cher song "Believe" popularized the technique of using Auto-Tune to distort vocals. In 2018, the music critic Simon Reynolds observed that Auto-Tune had "revolutionized popular music", calling its use for effects "the fad that just wouldn't fade. Its use is now more entrenched than ever."

In its role distorting vocals, Auto-Tune operates on different principles from the vocoder or talk box and produces different results.

Description

Auto-Tune is available as a plug-in for digital audio workstations used in a studio setting and as a stand-alone, rack-mounted unit for live performance processing. The processor slightly shifts pitches to the nearest true, correct semitone (to the exact pitch of the nearest note in traditional equal temperament). Auto-Tune can also be used as an effect to distort the human voice when pitch is raised or lowered significantly, such that the voice is heard to leap from note to note stepwise, like a synthesizer.

Auto-Tune has become standard equipment in professional recording studios. Instruments such as the Peavey AT-200 guitar seamlessly use Auto-Tune technology for real time pitch correction.

History

Auto-Tune was launched in September 1997 by Andy Hildebrand, a Ph.D. research engineer who specialized in stochastic estimation theory and digital signal processing. Over several months in early 1996, he implemented the algorithm on a custom Macintosh computer, and presented the result at the NAMM Show later that year, where "it was instantly a massive hit."

His method for detecting pitch involved the use of autocorrelation and proved to be superior to earlier attempts based on feature extraction that had problems processing certain aspects of the human voice such as diphthongs, leading to sound artifacts. Music industry engineers had previously considered the use of autocorrelation impractical because of the massive computational effort required, but Hildebrand found a "simplification [that] changed a million multiply adds into just four. It was a trick – a mathematical trick".

According to the Auto-Tune patent, the referred implementation detail simply consists, when processing new samples, of reusing the former autocorrelation bin, and adding the product of the new sample with the older sample corresponding to a lag value, while subtracting the autocorrelation product of the sample that correspondingly got out of window.

Hildebrand had come up with the idea for a vocal pitch correction technology on the suggestion of a colleague's wife, who had joked that she could benefit from a device to help her sing in tune.  Originally, Auto-Tune was designed to discreetly correct imprecise intonations, in order to make music more expressive, with the original patent asserting that "When voices or instruments are out of tune, the emotional qualities of the performance are lost."

According to Chris Lee of the Los Angeles Times, Cher's 1998 song "Believe" is "widely credited with injecting Auto-Tune's mechanical modulations into pop consciousness". Cher's producers used the device to "exaggerate the artificiality of abrupt pitch correction", contrary to its original purpose.

In an early interview, the producers of "Believe" claimed they had used a DigiTech Talker FX pedal, in what Sound on Sound editors felt was an attempt to preserve a trade secret. After the success of "Believe" the technique was initially referred to as the "Cher effect".

The English rock band Radiohead used Auto-Tune on their 2001 album Amnesiac to create a "nasal, depersonalised sound" and to process speech into melody. According to singer Thom Yorke, the software "desperately tries to search for the music in your speech, and produces notes at random. If you've assigned it a key, you've got music."

The use of Auto-Tune as a vocal effect was bolstered in the late 2000s by hip hop/R&B recording artist T-Pain, who elaborated on the effect and made active use of Auto-Tune in his songs. He cites new jack swing producer Teddy Riley and funk artist Roger Troutman's use of the talk box as inspirations for his own use of Auto-Tune. T-Pain became so associated with Auto-Tune that he had an iPhone app named after him that simulated the effect, called "I Am T-Pain". Eventually dubbed the "T-Pain effect", the use of Auto-Tune became a popular fixture of late 2000s music, where it was notably used in other hip hop/R&B artists' works, including Snoop Dogg's single "Sexual Eruption", Lil Wayne's "Lollipop", and Kanye West's album 808s & Heartbreak. In 2009, riding on the wave of Auto-Tune's popularity, the Black Eyed Peas' number-one hit, "Boom Boom Pow", made heavy use of Auto-Tune on all the group's vocals to create a futuristic sound.

The use of Auto-Tune in hip hop gained a resurgence in the mid-2010s, especially in trap music. Hip hop artists like Future, Playboi Carti, Travis Scott, and Lil Uzi Vert used Auto-Tune to create a signature sound.

The effect has also become popular in raï music and other genres from Northern Africa. According to the Boston Herald, country stars Faith Hill, Shania Twain, and Tim McGraw use Auto-Tune in performance, calling it a safety net that guarantees a good performance. However, other country music singers, such as Allison Moorer, Garth Brooks, Big & Rich, Trisha Yearwood, Vince Gill and Martina McBride, have refused to use Auto-Tune.

Reception

Negative
At the 51st Grammy Awards in early 2009, the band Death Cab for Cutie made an appearance wearing blue ribbons to protest against the use of Auto-Tune in the music industry. Later that spring, Jay-Z titled the lead single of his album The Blueprint 3 as "D.O.A. (Death of Auto-Tune)". Jay-Z elaborated that he wrote the song under the personal belief that the trend had become a gimmick which had become far too widely used. Christina Aguilera appeared in public in Los Angeles on August 10, 2009, wearing a T-shirt that read "Auto Tune is for Pussies". When later interviewed by Sirius/XM, however, she clarified that Auto-Tune could be used "in a creative way" and noted her song "Elastic Love" from Bionic uses it.

Opponents of the plug-in have argued that Auto-Tune has a negative effect on society's perception and consumption of music. In 2004, The Daily Telegraph music critic Neil McCormick called Auto-Tune a "particularly sinister invention that has been putting extra shine on pop vocals since the 1990s" by taking "a poorly sung note and transpos[ing] it, placing it dead centre of where it was meant to be".

In 2009, Time magazine quoted an unnamed Grammy-winning recording engineer as saying, "Let's just say I've had Auto-Tune save vocals on everything from Britney Spears to Bollywood cast albums. And every singer now presumes that you'll just run their voice through the box." The same article expressed "hope that pop's fetish for uniform perfect pitch will fade", speculating that pop-music songs have become harder to differentiate from one another, as "track after track has perfect pitch." According to Tom Lord-Alge, the device is used on nearly every record these days.

In 2010, the reality TV show The X Factor admitted to using Auto-Tune to improve the voices of contestants. Also in 2010, Time magazine included Auto-Tune in their list of "The 50 Worst Inventions".

Neko Case in a 2006 interview with Pitchfork gave an example of how prevalent pitch correction is in the industry:

Used by stars from Snoop Dogg and Lil Wayne to Britney Spears and Cher, Auto-Tune has been widely criticized as indicative of an inability to sing on key. Trey Parker used Auto-Tune on the South Park song "Gay Fish", and found that he had to sing off-key in order to sound distorted; he claimed, "You had to be a bad singer in order for that thing to actually sound the way it does. If you use it and you sing into it correctly, it doesn't do anything to your voice." Electropop recording artist Kesha has been widely recognized as using excessive Auto-Tune in her songs, putting her vocal talent under scrutiny. Music producer Rick Rubin wrote that "Right now, if you listen to pop, everything is in perfect pitch, perfect time and perfect tune. That's how ubiquitous Auto-Tune is." Time journalist Josh Tyrangiel called Auto-Tune "Photoshop for the human voice".

Big band singer Michael Bublé criticized Auto-Tune as making everyone sound the same – "like robots" – but admits to using it when he records pop-oriented music.

Ellie Goulding and Ed Sheeran have called for honesty in live shows by joining the "Live Means Live" campaign. "Live Means Live" was launched by songwriter/composer David Mindel. When a band displays the "Live Means Live" logo, the audience knows, "there's no Auto-Tune, nothing that isn't 100 per cent live" in the show, and there are no backing tracks.

Positive
Despite its negative reputation, some critics have argued that Auto-Tune opens up new possibilities in pop music, especially in hip-hop and R&B. Instead of using it as a correction tool for poor vocals—its originally designed purpose—some musicians intentionally use the technology to mediate and augment their artistic expression. When French house duo Daft Punk was questioned about their use of Auto-Tune in their single "One More Time", Thomas Bangalter replied by saying, "A lot of people complain about musicians using Auto-Tune. It reminds me of the late '70s when musicians in France tried to ban the synthesizer... What they didn't see was that you could use those tools in a new way instead of just for replacing the instruments that came before."

T-Pain, the R&B singer and rapper who reintroduced the use of Auto-Tune as a vocal effect in pop music with his album Rappa Ternt Sanga in 2005, said "My dad always told me that anyone's voice is just another instrument added to the music. There was a time when people had seven-minute songs and five minutes of them were just straight instrumental. ... I got a lot of influence from [the '60s era] and I thought I might as well just turn my voice into a saxophone." Following in T-Pain's footsteps, Lil Wayne experimented with Auto-Tune between his albums Tha Carter II and Tha Carter III. At the time, he was heavily addicted to promethazine codeine, and some critics see Auto-Tune as a musical expression of Wayne's loneliness and depression. Mark Anthony Neal wrote that Lil Wayne's vocal uniqueness, his "slurs, blurs, bleeps and blushes of his vocals, index some variety of trauma." And Kevin Driscoll asks, "Is Auto-Tune not the wah pedal of today's black pop? Before he transformed himself into T-Wayne on "Lollipop", Wayne's pop presence was limited to guest verses and unauthorized freestyles. In the same way that Miles equipped Hendrix to stay pop-relevant, Wayne's flirtation with the VST plugin du jour brought him updial from JAMN 94.5 to KISS 108."

Kanye West's 808s & Heartbreak was generally well received by critics, and it similarly used Auto-Tune to represent a fragmented soul, following his mother's death. The album marks a departure from his previous album, Graduation. Describing the album as a breakup album, Rolling Stone music critic Jody Rosen wrote, "Kanye can't really sing in the classic sense, but he's not trying to. T-Pain taught the world that Auto-Tune doesn't just sharpen flat notes: It's a painterly device for enhancing vocal expressiveness and upping the pathos ... Kanye's digitized vocals are the sound of a man so stupefied by grief, he's become less than human."

YouTuber Conor Maynard, who has received criticism for his use of Auto-Tune, defended the audio processor in an interview on the Zach Sang Show in 2019, stating: "It doesn't mean you can't sing ... auto-tune can't make anyone who can't sing sound like they can sing ... it just tightens it up ever so slightly because we're human and we are not perfect, whereas [Auto-Tune] is literally digitally perfect".

Impact and parodies
The US TV comedy series Saturday Night Live parodied Auto-Tune using the fictional white rapper Blizzard Man, who sang in a sketch: "Robot voice, robot voice! All the kids love the robot voice!"

Satirist "Weird Al" Yankovic poked fun at the overuse of Auto-Tune, while commenting that it seemed here to stay, in a YouTube video commented on by various publications such as Wired.

Starting in 2009, the use of Auto-Tune to create melodies from the audio in video newscasts was popularized by Brooklyn musician Michael Gregory, and later by the band the Gregory Brothers in their series Songify the News. The Gregory Brothers digitally manipulated recorded voices of politicians, news anchors, and political pundits to conform to a melody, making the figures appear to sing. The group achieved mainstream success with their "Bed Intruder Song" video, which became the most-watched YouTube video of 2010.

The Simpsons season 12 episode 14, "New Kids on the Blecch", satirizes the use of Auto-Tune.

In 2014, during season 18 of the animated show South Park, the character Randy Marsh uses Auto-Tune software to make the singing voice of Lorde.  In episode 3, "The Cissy", Randy shows his son Stan how he does it on his computer.

See also
 Audio time stretching and pitch scaling
 Melodyne, a similar product
 Overproduction (music)
 Robotic voice effects

References

External links
 artistic integrity and Auto-Tune
 CBC Radio One Q: The Podcast for Thursday June 25, 2009 MP3 – NPR's Tom Moon on the takeover of the Auto-Tune.
 "Auto-Tune", NOVA scienceNOW, PBS TV, June 30, 2009
 Andy Hildebrand Interview – NAMM Oral History Library (2012)

Pitch modification software
1990s in music
2000s in music
2010s in music
Audiovisual introductions in 1997
Effects units